Air Departure Tax (ADT) is a pending tax intended to replace the UK-wide Air Passenger Duty in Scotland. Legislation has been passed to allow the introduction of the tax and it was originally expected to come into force on 1 April 2018. However, this has been delayed.

History
On 20 June 2017, the ADT was passed in the Scottish Parliament and received royal assent on 25 July 2017 and was meant to be introduced on 1 April 2018. However, on 22 November 2017, the UK and Scottish Ministers agreed to delay the introduction of ADT until issues have been resolved regarding the tax exemption for flights departing airports in the Highlands and Islands of Scotland.

In June 2018, the Scottish Government and UK Government agreed that it would not be possible to introduce the ADT in April 2019. Air Passenger Duty has continued to apply for airports in Scotland and HMRC has continued to administer APD in relation to flights in Scotland.

Rate
The Scottish Government intended to reduce the rate by 50%, and eventually abolish it completely once finances allowed. This caused concern that such a move could damage tourism in England. However, in 2019 the Scottish Government abandoned its plans to cut Air Departure Tax as the proposals were no longer considered compatible with Scotland's climate change targets.

See also
Taxation in Scotland
Tourism in Scotland

References

External links
Official website

2018 in Scotland
Taxation in Scotland
Aviation in Scotland
Tourism in Scotland
2018 establishments in Europe
2018 in British politics
Aviation taxes